Adimolol (developmental code name MEN-935) is antihypertensive agent which acts as a non-selective α1-, α2-, and β-adrenergic receptor antagonist.

Synthesis

The reaction between 1-Naphthyl glycidyl ether [2461-42-9] (1) and 3-(3-amino-3-methylbutyl)-1H-benzimidazol-2-one [64928-58-1] (2) gives adimolol (3).

References

Alpha-1 blockers
Alpha-2 blockers
Amines
Benzimidazoles
Beta blockers
Lactams
Naphthol ethers
Secondary alcohols
Ureas